Narufuchi Dam is a dam in Sasaguri, in the Fukuoka Prefecture of Japan, completed in 2001.

References

Dams in Fukuoka Prefecture
Dams completed in 2001